The Skip Prosser Man of the Year Award is an award given annually to the nation's men's head basketball coach in NCAA Division I competition who also exhibits strong moral character. The award was established in 2008 and is named for head coach Skip Prosser, who spent most of his coaching tenure at Xavier and Wake Forest. Prosser is the only coach in NCAA history to lead three separate teams to the NCAA Tournament in his first season with the team. Prosser died from a heart attack on July 26, 2007, at age 56.

Winners

Winners by school

See also
Kay Yow Award – an annual award given to an NCAA Division I women's basketball coach who exhibits moral character both on and off the court; the award is also presented by CollegeInsider.com

References
General

Specific

External links
 

College basketball coaching awards in the United States
Awards established in 2008